Nebraska Highway 74 is a highway in southern Nebraska.  Its western terminus is at an intersection with Nebraska Highway 10 in Minden.  Its eastern terminus is at an intersection with Nebraska Highway 15 east of Tobias.

Route description
Nebraska Highway 74 begins in Minden at an intersection with NE 10.  It leaves Minden heading in an eastward orientation into farmland, turning periodically to the south before passing through Norman and Holstein.  East of Holstein, the highway passes through Roseland before turning to the south and east again.  After passing through Ayr, NE 74 intersects with US 281 and runs concurrently with it for just over a mile.  After US 281 turns to the north, NE 74 will continue eastward, passing through Fairfield and the Army National Guard Training Site to the northwest of Fairfield.

East of Fairfield, the highway meets NE 14 and runs concurrently southward with it for a mile before splitting off to the east again.  NE 74 will pass through Shickley as it heads eastward.  Further east, it intersects with US 81 south of Geneva.  Continuing to the east, the highway passes through Tobias.  After leaving Tobias, it continues east to NE 15 which is where it terminates.

Major intersections

References

External links

Nebraska Roads: NE 61-80

074
Transportation in Kearney County, Nebraska
Transportation in Adams County, Nebraska
Transportation in Clay County, Nebraska
Transportation in Fillmore County, Nebraska
Transportation in Saline County, Nebraska